Discordia is the second studio album by American death metal band Misery Index.

Track listing

Personnel 
Jason Netherton – bass, vocals
Mark Kloeppel – guitar, vocals
Sparky Voyles – guitar
Adam Jarvis – drums
Andy Huskey – vocals ("Pandemican")

Production
Eyal Levi – engineering, mixing, production
Reagan Wexler – assistant engineering, assistant mixing
Rodney Mills – mastering
Gary Fly – photography
Timothy Leo – artwork design
Greg Houston – artwork

References 

2006 albums
Relapse Records albums
Misery Index (band) albums